Cuviera is a genus of flowering plants in the family Rubiaceae native to tropical Africa. It was originally described by Augustin Pyramus de Candolle in 1807 and is named after the French naturalist Georges Cuvier.

Description
The species form a homogeneous group that is well characterized by their striped petals, many-flowered inflorescences and usually ant holes in the twigs. The bracts are recaulescent, which means that the first node of the inflorescence is bare and the lowest bracts are inserted at the second node.

Distribution and habitat
The genus is found in the Guineo-Congolian rainforest zone. The centre of diversity is the Lower Guinean forests; two species occur in the Upper Guinean forests, and only C. angolensis extends into the Congolian forests.

Most species are relatively light demanding, favouring secondary or riverine forest, but some are found in the understory as well. They often grow in clusters.

Taxonomy
At one time, the genus Globulostylis was considered as a subgenus of Cuviera, but it has been re-established as an accepted genus.

Species
Accepted species according to the latest revision.

 Cuviera acutiflora DC. - from Liberia to Equatorial Guinea
 Cuviera angolensis Welw. ex K.Schum. - Zaïre (Congo-Kinshasa or Democratic Republic of Congo), Cabinda, Angola
 Cuviera le-testui Pellegr. - Congo-Brazzaville, Equatorial Guinea, Gabon, Zaïre (Congo-Kinshasa or Democratic Republic of Congo)
 Cuviera longiflora Hiern - Nigeria, Central African Republic, Cameroon, Congo-Brazzaville, Gabon, Bioko 
 Cuviera macroura K.Schum. - Benin, Ghana, Guinea, Côte d'Ivoire, Liberia, Nigeria, Sierra Leone, Cameroon 
 Cuviera physinodes K.Schum. - Cameroon, Equatorial Guinea, Gabon
 Cuviera pierrei N.Hallé   - Equatorial Guinea, Gabon
 Cuviera subuliflora Benth. - Cameroon, Equatorial Guinea, Gabon, Zaïre (Congo-Kinshasa or Democratic Republic of Congo), Congo-Brazzaville, Nigeria, Gulf of Guinea Islands  
 Cuviera trilocularis Hiern - Nigeria, Cameroon
 Cuviera truncata Hutch. & Dalziel - Nigeria, Cameroon

formerly included
The following species are excluded from Cuviera based on morphological and molecular data, some of which have not yet been formally transferred to other genera.

 Cuviera australis K.Schum. = Vangueria lasiantha (Sond.) Sond. - Mozambique, South Africa
 Cuviera bolo Aubrèv. & Pellegr. = Robynsia glabrata Hutch. - Ivory Coast, Ghana, Nigeria
 Cuviera calycosa Wernham - Nigeria, Cameroon, Zaïre (Congo-Kinshasa or Democratic Republic of Congo), Congo-Brazzaville
 Cuviera migeodii Verdc. - Tanzania
 Cuviera nigrescens (Elliott ex Oliv.) Wernham - from Liberia to Zaïre (Congo-Kinshasa or Democratic Republic of Congo)
 Cuviera schliebenii Verdc. - Tanzania, Mozambique
 Cuviera semseii Verdc. - Tanzania, Malawi, Mozambique
 Cuviera tomentosa Verdc. - Tanzania, Mozambique

References

External links
Cuviera in the World Checklist of Rubiaceae

Rubiaceae genera
Vanguerieae
Flora of Africa